Petros Zappas was a Greek entrepreneur and politician and a member of the Zappas family of national benefactors originally from Labovë of Aromanian descent. This village would later form part of the short-lived Autonomous Republic of Northern Epirus. In World War I, during Greek administration between October 1914 and September 1916, Petros Zappas was elected as member of the Greek Parliament for the Argyrokastron Prefecture (1915–1917) in the December 1915 elections.

See also
 Evangelos Zappas
 Konstantinos Zappas

References

Year of birth missing
Year of death missing
People from Gjirokastër
Northern Epirus independence activists
Albanian people of Aromanian descent
Greek people of Aromanian descent
Greek MPs 1915–1917